The Women's omnium competition at the 2022 UCI Track Cycling World Championships was held on 14 October 2022.

Results

Scratch race
The scratch race was started at 14:19.

Tempo race
The tempo race was started at 16:50.

Elimination race
The elimination race was started at 19:34.

Points race and overall standings
The points race was started at 21:01.

References

Women's omnium